Garelet Dod is a hill in the Moffat Hills range, part of the Southern Uplands of Scotland. A broad, flat summit like its neighbour Cape Law, it is commonly ascended from Talla Linfoots to the north on the way to the higher summits to the southwest and southeast, usually as part of a round.

References

Mountains and hills of the Southern Uplands
Mountains and hills of the Scottish Borders
Donald mountains